Lewisburg is the name of several places in the United States of America:

Lewisburg, Indiana
Lewisburg, Kentucky
Lewisburg, former name of Melber, Kentucky
Lewisburg, Ohio
Lewisburg, Oregon
Lewisburg, Pennsylvania
Lewisburg, Tennessee
Lewisburg, West Virginia

See also
Louisburg (disambiguation)
Lewiston (disambiguation)
Lewistown (disambiguation)
Lewisville (disambiguation)